Amagney is a commune in the Doubs department in  Bourgogne-Franche-Comté in eastern France, close to Besançon.

Population

See also
 Communes of the Doubs department

References

Communes of Doubs